KCBP (95.5 FM) is a radio station licensed to serve the community of Westley, California. The station is owned by Modesto Peace/Life Center and airs a community radio format.

The station was assigned the KCBP call letters by the Federal Communications Commission on April 6, 2017.

References

External links
 Official Website
 

CBP
Radio stations established in 2018
2018 establishments in California
Community radio stations in the United States
Stanislaus County, California